Hakea circumalata is a shrub in the family Proteaceae native to an area in the  Wheatbelt and Mid West regions of Western Australia. A small shrub producing  a profusion of strongly scented pink to red flowers in dense clusters from July to September.

Description
Smaller branches are densely covered with short, soft, flattened rusty coloured hairs. The leaves grow upright, slightly tapering with a very sharp point at the apex. The inflorescence consists of 6-12 strongly scented white, pink or reddish brown clusters of flowers. The white and pink perianth are smooth or having coarse longish hairs. Flowers appear in leaf axils on the smaller branches from July to September. Fruit are erect on the stem, egg-shaped and often solitary ending in two prominent horns. The surface is smooth in between the many small rounded protuberances. The fruit have two winged, silky, dark brown  seeds and are retained on the shrub.

Taxonomy and naming
Hakea circumalata was first formally described by botanist Carl Meisner in 1855 and the description was published in Hooker's Journal of Botany and Kew Garden Miscellany. The specific epithet (circumalata) is derived from the Latin word  circum meaning "around" and alatus meaning  "winged" referring to the seed which is surrounded by a wing.

Distribution and habitat
Hakea  circumalata grows from Shark Bay ranging south through to Wongan Hills and Corrigin. It grows on clay, deep sand and sand with lateritic gravel in heath and low woodland. Requires full sun and a well-drained site. An ornamental species that tolerates moderate frosts.  A good wildlife habitat due to its prickly dense growth habit.

Conservation status
Hakea circumalata is  classified as  "not threatened" by the Western Australian government Department of Parks and Wildlife.

References

circumalata
Eudicots of Western Australia
Plants described in 1855
Taxa named by Carl Meissner